The TVR Griffith, later models being referred to as the Griffith 500, is a sports car designed and built by TVR, starting production in 1990, and ending production in 2002. The Griffith name appeared again on a sports car introduced under a revived TVR brand in 2017.

First generation (1990–2002) 

Like its forerunner namesakes, the Griffith 200 and Griffith 400, the modern Griffith was a lightweight fiberglass-bodied, 2-door, 2-seat sports car with a V8 engine. Originally, it used a 4.0 L  Rover V8 engine, but that could be optionally increased to 4.3 L   in 1992 with a further option of big-valve cylinder heads. In 1993, with a TVR-developed 5.0 L  version of the Rover V8 became available. All versions of the Griffith use the Lucas Industries 14CUX engine management system. All models use a five-speed manual transmission from Rover and TREMEC.

Although the Griffith was almost mechanically identical to its sister car, the Chimaera, it had a different body design and was produced in much smaller numbers.

The Griffith was a lightweight, high-power, and well-balanced car. A low-cost speed six Griffith proposal never became a production reality; by the time it was launched alongside the Griffith in 1999, it had morphed into the Tuscan Speed Six.

A special edition Japanese market Griffith 500 was made dubbed the Blackpool B340. This car was featured in Gran Turismo, Gran Turismo 2 (in the former as the Griffith 4.0 in the NTSC and PAL versions) and Driving Emotion Type-S. The car was similar to a normal Griffith 500 with some bespoke options available. The Japanese market also got a B275 4.0 engined car with aluminium basketweave dashboard.

In 2000, TVR announced that the Griffith production was going to end. A limited edition run of 100 Special Edition (SE) cars were to be built to mark the end of production. Although still very similar to the previous Griffith 500 model, the SE had a hybrid interior using the Chimaera dashboard and Cerbera seats. Noticeably, the rear lights were different along with different door mirrors, higher powered headlights and clear indicator lenses. Some also came with 16-inch wheels. Each car came with a numbered plaque in the glove box including the build number and a Special Edition Badge on its boot. All cars also had a unique signature in the boot under the carpet. The SEs were built between 2000 and 2002, with the last registered in 2003.

Every year, to celebrate the TVR Griffith, their owners have a meet called "The Griff Growl."

In 2008, Al Melling Sports Cars unveiled the Melling Wildcat, a roadster heavily based on the Griffith but powered by a variant of TVR's later AJP8 engine.

Specifications 

Engine

Name: Rover alloy V8

Valvetrain setup: 2 valves per cylinder, Overhead Valve

Transmission

Transmission: 5-speed manual (Rover LT77 or Tremec T5)

Suspension

Front: Independent, double wishbones, coil-over gas dampers, sway bars

Rear: Independent, double wishbones, coil-over gas dampers, sway bars

Brakes

Front:  ventilated disc brakes

Rear:  ventilated disc brakes

Wheels
Front: 15 in aluminium alloy

Rear: 16 in aluminium alloy

Chassis/body

Body Panels: Glass fibre

Fuel Capacity: 57 Litres (12.5 Imp. gallons, 15.0 U.S. gal)

Weight: 1,060 kg (2,336 lb) (dry)

Length: 

Height: 

Width: 

Wheelbase: 

Front track: 

Rear track: 

Ground clearance:

Second generation (2023–) 

On 8 September 2017, to coincide with the marque's 70th anniversary year at the Goodwood Revival, a new Griffith was revealed under the now resurrected TVR marque, featuring design work by Gordon Murray. It features a Cosworth modified Ford Coyote 5.0-litre V8 engine producing , double wishbone suspension with adjustable coilover dampers, a carbon fibre ground effect chassis. The new Griffith retains the manual transmission as used in the previous TVR models, to keep the driving experience, but includes ABS, power steering, and traction control as standard, in order to handle the high power output and keep the car stable at high speeds. Design elements, such as large front air intakes, front splitter, active spoiler and rear integrated diffuser help in increasing aero dynamics. The car's interior follows the driving focused theme as well. Air conditioning, leather interior trim, and multimedia system come as standard as well. The Griffith was expected to start production in 2019, with an initial run of 500 Launch Edition (LE) cars and a price tag of £89,995. In November of 2021, EVO magazine reported that the new Griffith was yet to enter production and deliveries of completed vehicles were not expected until at least the end of 2023. EVO cited the COVID 19 pandemic, funding problems and damage to production facilities had caused development of the vehicle to stall. A new partnership between TVR and Ensorcia Automotive, has provided additional funds for development of the new Griffith.

Production by year 

 1992: 602
 1993: 230 (169 2DR + 61 500)
 1994: 292
 1995: 284
 1996: 288
 1997: 232
 1998: 231
 1999: 187
 2000: 90
 2001: 82
 2002: 64
 2023: To be started

Notes

References

External links 

 TVR Griffith official website
 TVR Griffith at PistonHeads.com
 TVR Griffith Info and Owners Register
 TVR Griffith 500 SE Register
 TVR Car Club
 Griffith MotorCar Club International

Griffith
Sports cars
Rear-wheel-drive vehicles
Coupés
Roadsters
2000s cars
Cars introduced in 1991